Chuan Peak is a peak, about  high, located  northeast of Barker Peak in the southern part of the Giggenbach Ridge, Ross Island. It was named, at the suggestion of P.R. Kyle, by the Advisory Committee on Antarctic Names (2000) after Raymond L. Chuan who, as a scientist with the Brunswick Corporation, Costa Mesa, California, undertook many airborne surveys of volcanic aerosols from Mount Erebus and also did sampling at the crater rim, 1983–84 and 1986–87; investigator (with Julie Palais) on a project which examined aerosols between Mount Erebus and the South Pole.

References 

Mountains of Ross Island